Anna Sofia Perpetua Paulsson (born 29 February 1984) is a former Swedish football player. During her career she played as a defender for Umeå IK and the Swedish national team. Paulson debuted for the national team on 10 February 2004 against Finland where they tied 1–1.

Career

Since her debut for Umeå in 2001, Paulson was an integral part of the team's defence. Throughout her 10 seasons with Umeå, they won one Super Cup, two UEFA Women's Cups, four Swedish Cups, and five Swedish championship gold medals.

In 2011 Umeå gave Paulson a rehabilitation contract to prove her fitness, but released her during the season. A tribunal later ruled that they broke the contract and awarded Paulson 138,000 kronor.

References

External links 
 National Team Profile
 

1984 births
Living people
Swedish women's footballers
Olympic footballers of Sweden
Footballers at the 2008 Summer Olympics
Sweden women's international footballers
Damallsvenskan players
Umeå IK players
2007 FIFA Women's World Cup players
Women's association football fullbacks
Sportspeople from Umeå